Capt. Jim's Popeye Club was the name of two local (but unrelated) children's programs in the United States that featured Popeye the Sailor Man cartoons, combined with live hosts and segments. Both versions were produced by Cox-owned stations WPXI/Pittsburgh and WSB-TV/Atlanta.

Pittsburgh Version
The original Capt. Jim's Popeye Club was a local Pittsburgh children's television series that ran on WIIC-TV (now WPXI) and was first played by Jim Sanders, who was later replaced by Ted Eckman, who used the name "Jim" instead of "Ted" was because another person was using the "Captain Ted" name. The "Captain Jim" show is further asserted to have been broadcast from 1959 to about 1965 in an after-school time slot with Popeye cartoons, with this version of the show running for an hour. The puppetry was done by Jim Martin, who also played the role of Bimbo the Clown in the show's final days in the early 1970s.    Martin later became a puppeteer for Sesame Street. The second version was a half-hour show broadcast starting in 1970 and running for "a few years." This show ran in the early-morning hours targeted for pre-schoolers. It contained the syndicated series "New Zoo Revue".

The series was described as a "classic" in 2005, by Bob Karlovits of the Pittsburgh Tribune-Review. Ted Eckman was playing the role of Major Ted at WKBN in Youngstown Ohio when he was asked to come to Pittsburgh (1959) to take over Captain Jim's Popeye Club.  (One of his daughters sent a note and some fotos to TVParty several years ago)

Atlanta Version
An earlier "Popeye Club" series, hosted by "Officer Don" (actually local radio announcer and actor Don Kennedy) had a long run of more than ten years on local television in Atlanta, Georgia, beginning in the late 1950s. It was telecast on WSB-TV (WPXI's sister station), at that time the local NBC affiliate, on weekdays from 5:00 to 6:00 P.M. Eastern Standard Time. In addition to showing "Popeye" cartoons (both old and new), it featured interviews with celebrities promoting family films, such as Virginia McKenna and Bill Travers talking about their newly released film Born Free, and children's games such as "Untie the Knot", musical chairs, and most famously, "Ooey-Gooey". This was a game which featured four grocery bags which rotated on a platform. Three of them contained groceries, but the fourth always contained a gooey mixture of egg yolk and other items. The contestant (always a child, although Officer Don occasionally played) would be blindfolded, the platform would be turned, and then the contestant was required to stick his/her hand into one of the grocery bags, not knowing if they would clutch a grocery item or the gooey mixture.

The WSB-TV version not only showed the old Popeye cartoons but also those created especially for the TV series Popeye the Sailor. However, in Pittsburgh, ABC affiliate WTAE-TV also aired a Popeye related program that featured the 1960-62 TV series while WIIC had the theatrical versions. (The TV version were owned by King Features Syndicate, whose parent company Hearst Corporation also owned WTAE).

See also
List of local children's television series

Local children's television programming in the United States
1970s American children's television series
American television shows featuring puppetry